Lucasidia is a monotypic moth genus of the family Noctuidae. Its only species, Lucasidia phenax, is found in Morocco. Both the genus and species were first described by Charles Boursin in 1937.

References

Acronictinae